The International Symposium on Endovascular Therapy (ISET) is an educational meeting for physicians, scientists, engineers and allied health professionals working in the multidisciplinary field of peripheral and cardiac interventional medicine. The meeting provides information on the latest techniques and technology for the diagnosis, treatment and prevention of vascular diseases, among them stroke, heart attack, aneurysm and hardening of the arteries. The meeting highlights life-saving procedures that are considered less invasive than traditional surgery.

The five-day course was founded in 1989 by interventionist Barry Katzen, M.D., the founder and medical director of the Miami-based Baptist Cardiac & Vascular Institute (BCVI), which presents the meeting.  

The ISET meeting is presented annually in South Florida and draws attendees and prominent faculty speakers from around the world. In addition to Dr. Katzen, the following serve as course directors and are responsible for the meeting’s programming: James F. Benenati, M.D.; Alex Powell, M.D.; Ramon Quesada, M.D.; Shaun Samuels, M.D.; and Constantino Peña, M.D.

External links
ISET website
BCVI

Medical conferences